Morse code abbreviations are used to speed up Morse communications by foreshortening textual words and phrases. Morse abbreviations are short forms, representing normal textual words and phrases formed from some (fewer) characters taken from the word or phrase being abbreviated. Many are typical English abbreviations, or short acronyms for often-used phrases.

Distinct from prosigns and commercial codes
Morse code abbreviations are not the same as prosigns. Morse abbreviations are composed of (normal) textual alpha-numeric character symbols with normal Morse code inter-character spacing; the character symbols in abbreviations, unlike the delineated character groups representing Morse code prosigns, are not "run together" or concatenated in the way most prosigns are formed.

From 1845 until well into the second half of the 20th century, commercial telegraphic code books were used to shorten telegrams, e.g.  = "Locals have plundered everything from the wreck." However, these cyphers are typically "fake" words six characters long, or more, used for replacing commonly used whole phrases, and are distinct from single-word abbreviations.

Word and phrase abbreviations
The following Table of Morse code abbreviations and further references to Brevity codes such as 92 Code, Q code, Z code, and R-S-T system serve to facilitate fast and efficient Morse code communications.

{| class="wikitable"
|+Table of selected Morse code abbreviations
|-
! Abbreviation
! Meaning
! Defined in
! Type of abbreviation
|-
| 
| All after (used after question mark to request a repetition)
| ITU-R M.1172
| operating signal
|-
| 
| All before (similarly)
| ITU-R M.1172
| operating signal
|-
| 
| Address
| ITU-T Rec. F.1
| operating signal
|-
| 
| Address
| ITU-R M.1172
| operating signal
|-
| 
| Again
|
| operating signal
|-
| 
| Antenna
|
|
|-
| 
| End of transmission.
| ITU-R M.1172
| operating signal 
|-
| 
| Wait
|
| operating signal
|-
| 
| Break (to pause transmission of a message, say)
| ITU-R M.1172
| operating signal
|-
| 
| All between
| ITU-R M.1172
| operating signal
|-
| 
| Yes; correct; affirmative
|
| operating signal
|-
| 
| Confirm
| ITU-R M.1172
| operating signal
|-
| 
| Check
|
|
|-
| 
| Closing (I am closing my station)
| ITU-R M.1172
| operating signal
|-
|  ... ...
| Calling several stations (followed by the call signs of two or more stations, e.g.  for "calling stations A1BCD and W2XYZ")
| 
| operating signal
|-
| 
| ITU-R M.1172
| operating signal
|-
| 
| All stations distress (used preceding  to let all operators know of an impending distress signal)
|
| operating signal
|-
|  ...
| Calling station (followed by the call sign of a particular station, e.g.  for "calling station W2XYZ")
| ITU-R M.1172
| operating signal
|-
| ?
| What call sign? (used with "?" to request a contact's call sign)
| ITU-R M.1172
| operating signal
|-
|  ...
| From (or "this is")
| ITU-R M.1172
| operating signal
|-
| 
| Long distance, foreign countries (sometimes refers to long distance contact)
|
|
|-
| 
| And / [&] / also / et
| American Morse code 
|
|-
| 
| Good (literal abbr. "fine business")
| Amateur radio slang; suspected euphemism
|
|-
| 
| From (see )
|
| operating signal
|-
| 
| Forward
|
|
|-
| 
| I say again; I repeat; ditto
|
|
|-
| 
| Invitation to transmit
| ITU-R M.1172, ITU-R M.1677-1
| operating signal
|-
| 
| Over to you; only the previously named station should respond (e.g. after ; only station K6PCH should reply to W1AW)
| ITU-R M.1677-1
| operating signal
|-
| 
| Poor operator (derogatory)
| Wire telegraph slang, same as 
|
|-
| 
| Prefix indicating a message to or from the master of a ship concerning its operation or navigation
| ITU-R M.1172
|
|-
| 
| No; nine
|
|
|- 
| 
| I have nothing to send you
| ITU-R M.1172
|
|-
| 
| Number follows
|
| operating signal
|-
| 
| Okay
| ITU-R M.1172, ITU-T Rec. F.1
| operating signal
|-
| 
| Old Man (any male radio operator or the spouse of a female radio operator, both regardless of age)
| Amateur radio slang
| 
|-
| 
| Please (not appropriate after ; see )
| ITU-T Rec. F.1
|
|-
| 
| Paper
| ITU-T Rec. F.1
|
|-
| 
| Please (not appropriate after ; see )
| ITU-R M.1172
|
|-
| 
| Prefix
|
|
|-
| 
| Received as transmitted (origin of "Roger")
| ITU-T Rec. F.1
| operating signal
|-
| 
| Receiver / Receive
|
|-
| 
| Report / Repeat please / I repeat as follows
| ITU-R M.1172, ITU-T Rec. F.1
|
|-
| 
| Signal report format (Readability / Signal Strength / Tone)
|
| operating signal
|-
| 
| So far (proword)
|
|
|-
| 
| Signature
| ITU-T Rec. F.1
|
|-
| 
| Out (prosign), end of contact
|
| operating signal
|-
| 
| Silent Key (a deceased radio amateur)
|
|-
| 
| Please (French: "S'il vous plaît")
| ITU-T Rec. F.1
|
|-
| 
| Dollars
| Phillips Code
|-
| 
| Thank You
|
|-
| 
| Transmitter / Transmit
|
|-
| 
| Word / Words
| ITU-T Rec. F.1
|
|-
| 
| Word after
| ITU-R M.1172
| operating signal
|-
| 
| Word before
| ITU-R M.1172
| operating signal
|-
| 
| Wilco; "Will comply"
|
| operating signal
|-
| 
| Word / Words
| ITU-R M.1172
|
|-
| 
| Weather / Weather report follows
| ITU-R M.1172
|
|-
| 
| Transceiver
|
|
|-
| 
| Former Young Lady (female spouse of radio operator, regardless of age)
| Amateur radio slang
|
|-
| 
| Young Lady (any female radio operator, regardless of age)
| Amateur radio slang
|
|-
| 
| Zulu time i.e. UTC
|
| operating signal
|-
| 161
| Best regards + Love and kisses; used on  networks as a sign-off
|
| sum of two 92 Codes
|-
| 30
| No more; this is the end; finished
|
| 92 Code
|-
| 73
| Best regards
|
| 92 Code
|-
| 75
| Derogatory term for a disliked operator (Referring to 75 meter ham band)
| Amateur radio slang
|
|-
| 88
| Love and kisses
|
| 92 Code
|}

An amateur radio Morse code conversation example 
To make Morse code communications faster and more efficient, there are many internationally agreed patterns or conventions of communication which include: extensive use of abbreviations, use of brevity codes such as 92 Code, RST code, Q code, Z code as well as the use of Morse prosigns. The skills required to have efficient fast conversations with Morse comprise more than simply knowing the Morse code symbols for the alphabet and numerals. Skilled telegraphists must also know many traditional International Morse code communications conventions.

In the following example of a typical casual Morse code conversation between two stations there is extensive use of such: Morse code abbreviations, brevity codes, Morse procedural signs, and other such conventions.

An example casual Morse code (CW) conversation between Station S1ABC and Station S2YZ is illustrated in the following paragraphs. Here the actual Morse code information stream sent by each station (S1ABC and S2YZ) is shown in bold face small capitals type, and is followed below each bold face transmission by an indented interpretation of the message sent, together with short explanations of the codes. These translations and explanations are shown below each station's indicated transmission data stream.

 Calling anyone from  station S1ABC.
 End message. Go ahead anyone.

 

To station S1ABC from station S2YZ. Over to you only.
 = "" 

 To station S2YZ from station S1ABC.
 = =  = =
 Good afternoon 'dear old man' 
 Your RST rating is 599 here (at my station)
     9.  5

 The station operator's name is John.
 How do you copy my signal?
 To station S2YZ from station S1ABC:
 Over to you only.

 To station S1ABC from station S2YZ.
 Thanks for the good report
  
 'dear old man' John. You are [RST] 559.
 559

 I am in  Barcelona. 
 My name is Andy. 
 To station S1ABC from station S2YZ:
 Over to you only.

 To station S2YZ from station S1ABC.
 Okay, thanks for this conversation, 'dear' Andy.
 Best regards (73) and  hope to see you again.
 To station S2YZ from station S1ABC:
 Over to you only.

 To station S1ABC from station S2YZ.
 Roger
 Thank you see you again
 Best regards (73)
 To station S1ABC from station S2YZ:
 Signing off.
  = "", 
  = "",

Aside on shared codes

It is fairly common in the Recommended International Morse Code for punctuation codes to be shared with prosigns. For example, the code for plus or cross ([+] = ) is the same as the prosign for end of telegram, and the widely used but non-ITU "Over to you only" prosign  is the official code for open parenthesis [(] or left bracket.

The listener is required to distinguish the meaning by context. In the example casual conversation between two station operators, above, the Morse transmissions show the equal sign [=] in the same way that a simple electronic automatic Morse code reader with a one- or two-line display does: It can't distinguish context so it always displays the math symbol. It would also display an open parentheses [(] for the over to you only prosign ( = ).

The use of the end of section prosign  in casual exchanges essentially indicates a new paragraph in the text or a new sentence, and is a little quicker to send than a full stop ([.] = ) required in telegrams.

Normally an operator copying Morse code by hand or typewriter would decide whether the equal sign [=] or the "new section" prosign  was meant and start new paragraph in the recorded text upon reception of the code. This new paragraph copying convention is illustrated in the following example conversation. When decoding in one's head, instead of writing text on paper or into a computer file, the receiving operator copying mentally will interpret the  prosign for either a mental pause, or to jot down for later reference a short word or phrase from the information being sent.

Informal language-independent conversations 
Rag chewer is a name applied to amateur radio Morse code operators who engage in informal Morse code conversations (known as chewing the rag) while discussing subjects such as: The weather, their location, signal quality, and their equipment (especially the antennas being used).

Meaningful rag chewing between fluent Morse code operators having different native languages is possible because of a common language provided by the prosigns for Morse code, the International Q code, Z code, RST code, the telegraph era Phillips Code and 92 codes, and many well known Morse code abbreviations including those discussed in this article. Together all of these traditional conventions serve as a somewhat cryptic but commonly understood language (Lingua Franca) within the worldwide community of amateur radio Morse code operators.

These codes and protocols efficiently encode many well known statements and questions from many languages into short simple character groups which may be tapped out very quickly. The international Q code for instance encodes literally hundreds of full normal language sentences and questions in short three character codes each beginning with the character . For example, the code word  means My transmitting location is ... , which radio operators typically take instead to mean My home is ... . If this code word is followed by a question mark as ? it means What is your transmitting location?

Typically very few full words will be spelled out in Morse code conversations. Similar to phone texting, vowels are often left out to shorten transmissions and turn overs.

These techniques are similar to, and often faster than, texting on modern cellphones. Using this extensive Lingua Franca that is widely understood across many languages and cultures, surprisingly meaningful Morse code conversations can be efficiently conducted with short transmissions independently of native languages, even between operators who cannot actually communicate by voice because of language barriers!

With heavy use of the Q code and Morse code abbreviations, surprisingly meaningful conversations can readily occur. Note that in the preceding example conversation very few full English words have been used. In fact, in the above example S1 and S2 might not speak the same native language.
Although lengthy or detailed conversations could not, of course, be accomplished by radio operators with no common language.

Contesters often use a very specialized and even shorter format for their contacts. Their purpose is to process as many contacts as possible in a limited time (e.g. 100–150 contacts per hour).

See also
92 Code
ACP 131
Brevity code
Prosigns for Morse code
Phillips Code
Q code
R-S-T System
Z code

Footnotes

References

Morse code
Operating signals
Brevity codes